Giacosa, an Italian surname, may refer to:

Colleretto Giacosa, municipality in the Province of Turin
Bruno Giacosa (died 2018), Italian Piemonte wine producer

People 
Dante Giacosa (1905–1996), Italian car designer
Giuseppe Giacosa (1847–1906), Italian poet